Adamsoceras is a genus of actinocerids of the family Wutinoceratidae, with spheroidal siphuncle segments like Ormoceras, but having a reticular canal system like Wutinoceras. Adamsoceras has a slender, gently expanding, orthoconic shell that is slightly broader than high, i.e. depressed, with close spaced septa that form ventral lobes and a siphuncle that is near the ventral margin.

Adamsoceras is known from rocks of Whiterockian age (early Middle Ordovician) in Nevada, the Baltic, Tasmania, and Manchuria. It may have been derived from Wutinoceras, or from a common ancestor, and gave rise to Ormoceras.

The genotype is Adamsoceras isabelae from the upper Pogonip Group in Ikes Canyon in the Toquima Range in Nevada.

References 

Prehistoric nautiloid genera
Actinocerida
Middle Ordovician animals of North America
Taxa named by Rousseau H. Flower
Paleozoic life of Newfoundland and Labrador